"Little Demon" is a song by American singer Frank Ocean featuring vocals by British rapper Skepta. The song was intended to be sold as a 7-inch single in November 2019, but plans were scrapped in February 2020. The song was remixed by Venezuelan record producer Arca and previewed on Blonded Radio. The song has yet to be released digitally.

Background
"Little Demon" is the first collaboration between Ocean and Skepta. In November 2018, Ocean initially teased "Little Demon" by sharing a snippet of the song on Instagram. In October 2019, Ocean resumed his Blonded Radio show on Beats 1 and began a series of queer-themed club nights entitled PReP+. He released the single "DHL" and sold the upcoming songs "Cayendo" and "Dear April" as 7-inch vinyl singles. On October 30, 2019, Ocean announced that the his third PReP+ party would take place on Halloween and would be hosted by Venezuelan record producer Arca. During the party, Ocean and Arca debuted a new song featuring British rapper Skepta. The following day, Ocean released his follow-up single "In My Room" which was also sold on vinyl. The Skepta-featured song was then previewed as "Little Demon" on the ninth edition of Blonded Radio and sold as a 7-inch single.

Release and promotion
In November 2019, Ocean put up "Little Demon" on sale as a 7-inch single. In February 2020, Ocean's website Blonded.co sent out an email that stated that the release of "Little Demon" on vinyl was canceled. The vinyl was planned to be replaced with "a new, unreleased Frank Ocean song" instead. which was later canceled.

Critical reception
Michael Saponara, writing for Billboard, described the song as melancholic.

References

Frank Ocean songs
Skepta songs
Songs written by Frank Ocean